Anesara is a village located in Shimoga district of Karnataka, India.

Geography
The total geographical area of Anesara is 387.1 hectares, which makes it one of the biggest villages by area in Shimoga.

References

Villages in Shimoga district